The European Tree of the Year is an annual contest held to find the most 'loveable tree' in Europe.

The contest is held by the Environmental Partnership Association (EPA), an organization supported by the European Land Owners Association and the European Commission.

History 
The European Tree of the Year competition has been running since 2011 and selects a tree from participating countries (now 15 in number) by public vote. It was inspired by an earlier Czech national tree contest. Most countries hold a national poll to select their entrant for each year. Nominations are made in the year preceding the award. Voting for the European tree of the year commences on 1 February each year and lasts until the end of the month. A live, online display of the votes cast for each tree is displayed until the last week in February when final voting figures are kept secret. The winner is announced at an awards ceremony in late March held in the EU Parliament, Brussels.

Since 2015, there has been a promotional tree tour visiting many candidate trees during the voting month of February. Media PR events, and community, child led, art contests take place for each tree, with the winning art works being displayed at the awards ceremony.

In more recent years, a #TreesInNeed blog has been promoted by the contest organisers to highlight the plight of numerous trees across Europe under threat of destruction.

The UK's most successful tree in the contest is the Brimmon Oak, finishing 2nd in 2017.

Winners

Winners by country

See also
European City of the Trees
Tree of the Year (United Kingdom)
List of individual trees

References

External links
 

Website and Channel der Environmental Partnership Association

Flora of Europe
Competitions